This is a list of neighborhoods on Staten Island, one of the five boroughs of New York City.

 Annadale
 Arden Heights
 Arlington
 Arrochar
 Bay Terrace
 Bloomfield
 Brighton Heights
 Bulls Head
 Castleton Corners
 Charleston
 Chelsea
 Clifton
 Concord
 Dongan Hills
 Egbertville
 Elm Park
 Eltingville
 Emerson Hill
 Fort Wadsworth
 Graniteville
 Grant City
 Grasmere
 Great Kills
 Greenridge
 Grymes Hill
 Hamilton Park
 Heartland Village
 Huguenot
 Lighthouse Hill
 Livingston
 Manor Heights
 Mariners Harbor
 Meiers Corners
 Midland Beach
 New Brighton
 New Dorp
 New Springville
 Oakwood
 Old Place
 Old Town
 Pleasant Plains
 Port Ivory
 Port Richmond
 Prince's Bay
 Randall Manor
 Richmond Valley
 Richmondtown
 Rosebank
 Rossville
 Saint George
 Sandy Ground
 Shore Acres
 Silver Lake
 South Beach
 Stapleton
 Stapleton Heights
 Sunnyside
 Todt Hill
 Tompkinsville
 Tottenville
 Tottenville Beach
 Travis
 Ward Hill
 West New Brighton
 Westerleigh
 Willowbrook
 Woodrow

See also
List of Bronx neighborhoods
List of Brooklyn neighborhoods
List of Manhattan neighborhoods
List of Queens neighborhoods

External links

"NYC Neighborhoods Map", NYC Department of City Planning, 2014.
"Staten Island neighborhoods: What you need to know about all 63 communities", Staten Island Advance, 2015.

 
Staten Island neighborhoods
Neighborhoods
Staten Island